Susperia is a Norwegian black/thrash metal band formed in October 1998 by Tjodalv and Cyrus.

The band was originally named Seven Sins, but since there was another band with that name they changed it to the title of the horror film Suspiria, changing the spelling to avoid a clash with Suspiria, a gothic rock band that also took its name from the film.

History 
Susperia was started by Tjodalv (Dimmu Borgir, Old Man's Child) and Cyrus (Satyricon, Old Man's Child) in October 1998. After Tjodalv left Dimmu Borgir in the middle of March 1999, he started to concentrate fully on Susperia together with old-time friend Cyrus. At Wacken Open Air Festival in 1999, Tjodalv met with singer Athera (Vanaheim), who joined the band subsequently, followed by bass player Memnock (Old Man's Child, Vanaheim) and guitarist Elvorn. They recorded a demo, Illusions of Evil, in December 1999 at Pitfire Studio outside Oslo, which was mixed and mastered by L. Argedick. Synthesizer and piano parts were played by Mustis (Dimmu Borgir). He was briefly an official member of the band before he left to fully concentrate on Dimmu Borgir. Mustis returned to the band in 2010, after being fired from Dimmu Borgir.

The demo was sent out to different record companies and gained some positive feedback. They received a few offers from mainly major record labels and signed in early 2000 with Nuclear Blast for four records. Susperia played their first live gig at John Dee in Oslo, following Ragnarok and Alsvartr; just a few months later, they played at the Scream Magazine 10-year anniversary party.

Susperia is not a Satanic band, though their lyrics tend to criticise and question the views and morals of Christianity.

On 9 March 2009, it was reported that vocalist Athera (real name Pål Mathisen) had suffered a heart attack. It was later confirmed that he had been rushed into hospital in Lørenskog, suffering from acute stomach pain and heavy bleeding. He was expected to remain hospitalised for some time. It was later announced that he would undergo a triple bypass operation on 16 March 2009.

Susperia joined Melodi Grand Prix in 2011, but lost before the semi final. 

Cyrus is currently the touring bassist for Dimmu Borgir. 

In 2015, founding vocalist Athera left the band.

Band members 
Current members
 Terje "Cyrus" Andersen – guitars (1998–present)
 Christian "Elvorn" Hagen – guitars (1998–present)
 Ian Kenneth "Tjodalv" Åkesson – drums (1998–present)

Former members
 Øyvind Johan "Mustis" Mustaparta – keyboards (1998–2000; touring musician: 2010–2011)
 Håkon "Memnock" Didriksen – bass (1998–2019)
 Pål "Athera" Mathiesen – vocals (1998–2015; touring musician: 2019)
 Bernt "Dagon" Fjellstad – vocals (2015–2019; touring musician: 2009, 2014–2015)

Live musicians
 Lars "Tristhan" Fredriksen – bass (2019)

Timeline

Discography

Studio albums 
Predominance (2001)
Vindication (2002)
Unlimited (2004)
Cut from Stone (2007)
Attitude (2009)
The Lyricist (2018)

EPs/singles 
Devil May Care (2005)
 Nothing Remains (single, 2011)
 We Are the Ones (2011)

Demos 
Illusions of Evil (2000)

References

External links 
Official website (archived)

BNR Metal Pages -- Susperia
Susperia interview (German and English)

Norwegian heavy metal musical groups
Norwegian thrash metal musical groups
Norwegian black metal musical groups
Groove metal musical groups
Musical groups established in 1998
1998 establishments in Norway
Musical groups from Bærum
Nuclear Blast artists
Candlelight Records artists